James II of Avesnes (d. ca. 1205) was a knight of the Fourth Crusade. He was probably the son of James of Avesnes of Hainaut, who was a leading protagonist of the Third Crusade.

After the conquest of Constantinople James was one of the followers of Boniface of Montferrat, who had become king of Thessalonica. As part of the forces of Boniface in Greece he fought against Leo Sgouros, a Greek local ruler who had become independent. James received of Boniface in the spring of 1205 the island of Euboea (Triarchy of Negroponte) as a fief. James died around 1205 and Euboea was divided into three fiefs for Boniface.

Sources 
 John B. Bury: The Lombards and Venetians in Euboia. (1205–1303). In: The Journal of Hellenic Studies. 7, 1886, pp. 309–352.
 Louis de Mas Latrie: Les Seigneurs tierciers de Négropont. In: Revue de l'Orient latin. 1, 1893, pp. 413–432.
 

1205 deaths
Christians of the Fourth Crusade
People of the Kingdom of Thessalonica
Medieval Euboea
Year of birth missing
12th-century births